Edgar Davis can refer to:

 Edgar Davis (golfer) (1873–1927), American golfer
 Edgar Davis (sprinter) (born 1940), South African sprinter

See also
 Edgar Davids (born 1973), Dutch-Surinamese former footballer